The 1985–86 Honduran Liga Nacional season was the 20th edition of the Honduran Liga Nacional.  The format of the tournament consisted of two groups of five followed by a 4-team playoff round.  C.D. Marathón won the title after winning the final round and qualified to the 1986 CONCACAF Champions' Cup along with C.D. Motagua.

1985–86 teams

 Juventud de Sula (La Lima)
 Marathón (San Pedro Sula)
 Motagua (Tegucigalpa)
 Olimpia (Tegucigalpa)
 Platense (Puerto Cortés)
 Real España (San Pedro Sula)
 Tela Timsa (Tela, promoted)
 Universidad (Tegucigalpa)
 Victoria (La Ceiba)
 Vida (La Ceiba)

Regular season

Standings Group A

Standings Group B

Final round

Cuadrangular standings

Results

Relegation playoff

 Universidad relegated to second division.

Top scorer
  Juan Flores (Olimpia) with 9 goals

Squads

Trivia
 The clubs were divided into two groups of five for the first time in the League.
 Positions in the regular season were irrelevant.  The team with most points in the Final round were declared champions.
 This was the season with the less goals scored so far, only 187 goals in 104 games.

External links
 Official League website

References

Liga Nacional de Fútbol Profesional de Honduras seasons
1985–86 in Honduran football
Honduras